Diplocercides is a genus of prehistoric lobe-finned fish belonging to the coelacanth group (Actinistia or Coelacanthimorpha) which lived during the Late Devonian period (between 370 and 397 million years).  Fossils of Diplocercides have been found in Germany, Iran, Ireland, Australia and Poland (and possibly in South Africa in 1937). In 2010, three-dimensional fossils of Diplocercides were described from the Gogo Formation of Western Australia

Species of Diplocercides 
 D. davisi Moy-Thomas, 1937
 D. heiligenstockiensis Jessen, 1966
 D. kayseri von Koenen, 1895
 D. jaekeli Stensiö, 1922

References

Bibliography 
LONG, J.A. & TRINAJSTIC, K.  2010. The Late Devonian  Gogo Formation Lagerstatte –Exceptional preservation and Diversity in early Vertebrates. Annual Review of Earth and Planetary Sciences 38: 665-680

External links 
 Diplocercides at Palaeos.

Prehistoric lobe-finned fish genera
Devonian bony fish
Carboniferous bony fish
Fossils of Ireland
Devonian Australia
Fossils of Australia
Gogo fauna
Fossil taxa described in 1922